Kundurti Anjaneyulu (Telugu: కుందుర్తి ఆంజనేయులు) (16 December 1922 – 1982) was a Telugu poet. He was a winner of the Sahitya Akademi Award. He is also known as "Vachana Kavitha Pitamahudu" (Father of prose poetry).

Literary works
 Souptikam
 Rasadhuni
 Amavaasya
 Naa Preyasi
 Nayaagara
 Telangana
 Dandi Yaatra
 Asha
 Nagaramlo Vaana
 Naaloni Vaadaalu
 Hamsa Egiripoyindi
 Teera Nenu Kaasta Egiripoyaaka
 Meghamaala
 Idi Naa Jenda
 Kundurti Peethikalu
 Kundurti Vyaasaalu
 Batuku Maata

Awards
 Recipient of Sahitya Akademi Award to Telugu Writers in 1977.

Free Verse Trust
The group, "Free Verse Front", was founded by him and has been giving prizes since 1967. Free Verse Front Prize Trust was founded on 31 July 1979 in Hyderabad.

References

1922 births
1982 deaths
Telugu poets
Recipients of the Sahitya Akademi Award in Telugu
People from Guntur district
20th-century Indian poets
Poets from Andhra Pradesh